Santana do Ipanema is a municipality in the western half of the Brazilian state of Alagoas. It was founded in 1875 on the banks of the Ipanema river.

Its population was 47,819 (2020) and its area is 438 km².

References

Municipalities in Alagoas
Populated places established in 1875